Michał Znicz (born Michał Feiertag) (1888–1943) was a Polish stage and film actor.

Selected filmography
 Młody las (1934)
 Pieśniarz Warszawy (1934)
 Co mój mąż robi w nocy? (1934)
 Love, Cherish, Respect (1934)
 Panienka z poste restante (1935)
 Dwie Joasie (1935)
 Granny Had No Worries (1935)
 Kochaj tylko mnie (1935)
 Pan Twardowski (1936)
 Bolek i Lolek (1936)
 Dodek na froncie (1936)
 Róża (1936)
 Niedorajda (1937)
 A Diplomatic Wife (1937)
 Second Youth (1938)
 Robert and Bertram (1938)

Bibliography
 Skaff, Sheila. The Law of the Looking Glass: Cinema in Poland, 1896-1939. Ohio University Press, 2008.

External links

Michał Znicz at the Internet Polish Movie Database 

1888 births
1943 deaths
Polish male film actors
Male actors from Warsaw
Polish male stage actors
Polish cabaret performers
20th-century comedians